WDYL may refer to:

 WDYL (search engine), a search engine from Google
 WDYL-LD, a low-power television station (channel 15, virtual 28) licensed to serve Louisville, Kentucky, United States
 WDYL, former name of the American radio station WJSR